André Thapedi was a Democratic member of the Illinois House of Representatives, representing the 32nd District from 2009 to 2021. During his tenure, the 32nd district included all or portions of Auburn Gresham, Chicago Lawn, Ashburn, Chatham and West Englewood as well as portions of suburban Justice and Hickory Hills.

Early life and career
Thapedi is the son of Chicago neurosurgeon Isaac Martin Thapedi  and retired Cook County judge Llwellyn Thapedi. He attended LeMans Academy and St. Ignatius College Prep where he was a student athlete, leader, and selected as a "Chicagoland Outstanding Student". After graduating from Morehouse College he earned a law degree, with honors, from John Marshall Law School, where he was a president of the Black Law Students Association, national mock trial competition winner, national moot court competition winner, and published in their Journal of Computer and Information Law.

Thapedi worked as an intern with the office of the Cook County State's Attorney and the law department of the Chicago Transit Authority. He spent eight years as a trial, corporate, and transaction attorney before becoming a partner in the law firm of Thapedi & Thapedi where he represents both injured persons and businesses in civil litigation. He is also the managing broker for Shore Realty, LLC.

Illinois House of Representatives
Thapedi was elected in 2008 to succeed Milton Patterson. On July 31, 2017, Thapedi was appointed a member of the Trade Policy Task Force for a term ending December 31, 2018. The Trade Policy Task Force's function is to analyze important issues relative to the growth of international trade and make recommendations to Congress, the United States Trade Representative, and the White House National Trade Council regarding trade policy. The Task Force also promotes Illinois as a market for exporting and importing.

On January 31, 2021, it was reported by NPR that Thapedi would resign his seat during the 102nd General Assembly. Thapedi submitted his resignation March 17, 2021. On April 8, 2021, Cyril Nichols was appointed by Democratic leaders in the district to succeed him.

Electoral history

References

External links
Representative André Thapedi (D) 32nd District at Illinois General Assembly
By session: 98th, 97th, 96th
State Representative André Thapedi constituency site
 
André Thapedi at Illinois House Democrats

Living people
Illinois Democrats
Morehouse College alumni
John Marshall Law School (Chicago) alumni
Year of birth missing (living people)
21st-century American politicians